Julie Bishop (born Jacqueline Brown; August 30, 1914 – August 30, 2001), previously known as Jacqueline Wells, was an American film and television actress. She appeared in more than 80 films between 1923 and 1957.

Early life 
Julie Bishop was born Jacqueline Brown in Denver, Colorado on August 30, 1914. She used the family name Wells professionally through 1941, and also appeared on stage (and in one film) as Diane Duval. She was a child actress, beginning her career in 1923, in either Children of Jazz or Maytime (sources are contradictory).

Career 

By 1932, she was already a veteran film actress. Her earliest talkies were with the Hal Roach studio, where she worked in short-subject comedies with Laurel and Hardy, Charley Chase, and The Boy Friends. Then she began freelancing, working in supporting roles at large studios and in leading roles at small studios. Her ingenue role in the 1936 Laurel and Hardy feature The Bohemian Girl won her a contract at Columbia Pictures, where she starred in a succession of minor features, mostly action fare. She left Columbia in 1939 and resumed her freelance career.

In 1941, she was offered a contract by Warner Bros. on the condition that she change her name; "Jacqueline Wells" was considered a faded, B-picture name. She chose the name Julie Bishop because it matched the monograms on her luggage (created when her married name was Jacqueline Brooks).

She made 16 films at Warners, including supporting roles in Action in the North Atlantic (1943) with Humphrey Bogart and Princess O'Rourke (1943), starring Olivia de Havilland and Robert Cummings. While filming the latter, she met her second husband, Clarence Shoop, a pilot. She was Errol Flynn's leading lady in Northern Pursuit (1943), played Ira Gershwin's wife in the biopic Rhapsody in Blue (1945), and closed out her Warners years in 1946's Cinderella Jones.

In 1949, Bishop played a down-on-her-luck wife and mother in the Sands of Iwo Jima, opposite John Wayne. She was among several former Wayne co-stars (including Laraine Day, Ann Doran, Jan Sterling, and Claire Trevor) who joined the actor in 1954's aviation drama, The High and the Mighty. 

She went on to work in television, notably opposite Bob Cummings in his situation comedies. She retired from acting in 1957.

Personal life
Bishop married Walter Booth Brooks III in 1936; they divorced in 1939. In 1944, she married Gen. Clarence A. Shoop with whom she had two children: a son, Steve, a physician and pilot, and a daughter, actress Pamela Susan Shoop. The pair remained married until his death in 1968. She married William F. Bergin M.D. later the same year and they remained together until her death in 2001. 

Bishop was a Republican and campaigned for Dwight Eisenhower in the 1952 presidential election. 

She was also an Episcopalian.

Death
Bishop died of pneumonia on her 87th birthday, August 30, 2001 in Mendocino, California. She is interred at Forest Lawn Memorial Park in Glendale, California in the same plot as her second husband, Clarence A. Shoop.

Selected filmography

Children of Jazz (1923) as Child
Bluebeard's 8th Wife (1923) as Child
Maytime (1923) as Little Girl
Dorothy Vernon of Haddon Hall (1924) as Child Extra
The Good Bad Boy (1924) as Child (uncredited)
Captain Blood (1924) as Little Girl (uncredited)
The Golden Bed (1925) as Flora as a Child (uncredited)
The Homemaker (1925) as Helen Knapp
Classified (1925) as Jeanette
The Bar-C Mystery (1926)
The Family Upstairs (1926) as Annabelle Heller
Pardon Us (1931)
Scareheads (1931)
Any Old Port! (1932, Short) as Bride
Heroes of the West (1932) as Ann Blaine
Alice in Wonderland (1933)
Clancy of the Mounted (1933) as Ann Laurie
Tarzan the Fearless (1933) as Mary Brooks
Tillie and Gus (1933) as Mary Sheridan
 Happy Landing (1934)
The Black Cat (1934) as Joan Alison
The Loudspeaker (1934) as Janet Melrose
Kiss and Make-Up (1934) as Salon Client
Happy Landing (1934) as Janet Curtis
Square Shooter (1935) as Sally Wayne
Coronado (1935) as Barbara Forrest
Night Cargo (1936) as Claire Martineau, alias Marty 
The Bohemian Girl (1936 film) (1936) as Arline as an Adult
The Frame-Up (1937) as Betty Lindale
Girls Can Play (1937) as Ann Casey
Counsel for Crime (1937) as Ann McIntyre
She Married an Artist (1937) as Betty Dennis
Paid to Dance (1937) as Joan Bradley
Little Miss Roughneck (1938) as Mary LaRue
When G-Men Step In (1938) as Marjory Drake
Flight Into Nowhere (1938) as Joan Hammond
The Main Event (1938) as Helen Phillips
Highway Patrol (1938) as Jane Brady
Flight to Fame (1938) as Barbara Fiske
Spring Madness (1938) as Mady Platt
The Little Adventuress (1938) as Helen Gould
My Son Is a Criminal (1939) as Myrna Kingsley
Behind Prison Gates (1939) as Sheila Murray
Kansas Terrors (1939) as Maria del Montez
Torture Ship (1939) as Joan Martel
The Amazing Mr. Williams (1939) as Face of 7th Victim in Newspaper Photo (uncredited)
My Son is Guilty (1939) as Julia Allen
Girl in 313 (1940) as Lorna Hobart
The Ranger and the Lady (1940) as Jane Tabor
Young Bill Hickok (1940) as Louise Mason
Her First Romance (1940) as Eileen Strong
Back in the Saddle (1941) as Taffy
The Nurse's Secret (1941) as Florence Lentz
International Squadron (1941) as Mary Wyatt
Steel Against the Sky (1941) as Myrt
Wild Bill Hickok Rides (1942) as Violet - Chorus Girl
Lady Gangster (1942) as Myrtle Reed
I Was Framed (1942) as Ruth Marshall (Scott)
Escape from Crime (1942) as Molly O'Hara
Busses Roar (1942) as Reba Richards
The Hidden Hand (1942) as Rita Channing
The Hard Way (1943) as Chorine (uncredited)
Action in the North Atlantic (1943) as Pearl O'Neill
Princess O'Rourke (1943) as Stewardess (uncredited)
Northern Pursuit (1943) as Laura McBain
Hollywood Canteen (1944) as Junior Hostess (uncredited)
Rhapsody in Blue (1945) as Lee Gershwin
You Came Along (1945) as Mrs. Taylor
Idea Girl (1946) as Pat O'Rourke
Cinderella Jones (1946) as Camille
Murder in the Music Hall (1946) as Diane
Strange Conquest (1946) as Virginia Sommers
Last of the Redmen (1947) as Cora Munro
High Tide (1947) as Julie Vaughn
Deputy Marshall (1949) as Claire Benton
The Threat (1949) as Ann Williams
Sands of Iwo Jima (1949) as Mary
Riders of the Range (1950)
Secrets of Beauty (1951) as Ruth Waldron
Westward the Women (1951) as Laurie Smith
Sabre Jet (1953) as Mrs. Marge Hale
The High and the Mighty (1954) as Lillian Pardee
Headline Hunters (1955) as Laura Stewart
The Big Land (1957) as Kate Johnson (final film role)

References

External links

1914 births
2001 deaths
Actresses from Denver
Actresses from Texas
American child actresses
American stage actresses
American film actresses
Deaths from pneumonia in California
People from Wichita Falls, Texas
Warner Bros. contract players
20th-century American actresses
Burials at Forest Lawn Memorial Park (Glendale)
Texas Republicans
California Republicans
WAMPAS Baby Stars
American Episcopalians